No Name Lake is located in Glacier National Park, in the U. S. state of Montana. The lake is just north of Pumpelly Pillar in the Two Medicine region of Glacier National Park. No Name Lake is a  hike from the Two Medicine Store.

See also
List of lakes in Glacier County, Montana

References

Lakes of Glacier National Park (U.S.)
Lakes of Glacier County, Montana